Melvin Seeman (February 5, 1918 –  January 31, 2020) was an American social psychologist and emeritus professor of sociology at the University of California, Los Angeles (UCLA). He is known for researching social isolation. Seeman turned 100 in February 2018.

Biography
Seeman was born in Baltimore, Maryland, and received his Ph.D. from Ohio State University in 1947. He subsequently taught at Ohio State for several years, and eventually became an associate professor there. He also served as the director of Ohio State's Operations Research Group from 1956 to 1958. In 1959, he joined the faculty at UCLA, where he chaired the sociology department from 1977 to 1980. He taught at UCLA for 29 years before he retired. He has been the editor-in-chief of Sociometry, associate editor of the American Sociological Review, and the president of the Pacific Sociological Association.

Awards
In 1996, Seeman received the Cooley-Mead Award from the American Sociological Association's Section on Social Psychology.

References

External links
Faculty page (Internet Archive)
Story about Seeman on UCLA website (Internet Archive)

1918 births
2020 deaths
American centenarians
American social psychologists
Johns Hopkins University alumni
Men centenarians
Ohio State University alumni
Ohio State University faculty
University of California, Los Angeles faculty